Sociedad de Lucha Contra el Cancer (Society to Fight Cancer), a.k.a. SOLCA, is an Ecuadoran committee which disseminates techniques for fighting cancer.  It was formed on December 7, 1951.

History

During the 40s, Dr. Juan Tanca Marengo, a distinguished Ecuadorian doctor and humanist, worried about public health and all the different types of cancer, considered that it was necessary for him to share his oncologic knowledge with the medicine students and with doctors in general. His purpose was to establish prevention and healing campaigns, through the creation of an institute dedicated to the fight against cancer. December 7 of 1951, he calls a group of his closest doctor friends to found one of the public works with the most transcendence in Ecuador: the Sociedad de Lucha contra el cancer, or SOLCA.

In 1953, the government started to organize the creation of the building SOLCA, which was declared Society "fight with the cancer" in Ecuador.  
In 1957 the radiotheraphy and surgery department were built.
With the pass of the years SOLCA have grown been one of the most important hospitals in Ecuador.

Institute activities

Structure

Capacity of people: 155 beds 
Average lodge: 5.5 days 
Occupation average: 62.2%

Prevention

Not only it's important the fight against cancer, but it also is the prevention of it. Hence, the operation of this activity has been giving through interactive lectures, conferences, graphics and demonstrations among people.

a.- Professional Technicians from SOLCA.
b.- Professional Technicians from other institutions. 
c.- Population in general.

Diseases treated

Hodgkin adult diseases
Head and Neck tumors
Tumors located in tender parts
Lung Cancer
Thyroid Cancer
Breast Cancer
Leukemia
Intestinal Cancer
Esophagus Cancer
Stomach Cancer

Collaborators

Nowadays SOLCA is one of the most important hospitals in America. A lot of people, companies and industries collaborate daily with this institution. One of the most important and loyal one is the ladies' committee, which is a group of ladies from every social status that offers their services without any kind of reward.

References
Official SOLCA website (a parked domain)

Cancer organizations
Medical and health organisations based in Ecuador